Beghetto is an Italian surname. Notable people with the surname include:

Andrea Beghetto (born 1994), Italian footballer 
Giuseppe Beghetto (born 1939), Italian cyclist
Luigi Beghetto (born 1973), Italian footballer
Massimo Beghetto (born 1968), Italian footballer and manager

Italian-language surnames
it:Beghetto